Maxim Saury (February 27, 1928 – November 15, 2012) was a French jazz clarinetist and bandleader.

Career
The son of a violinist, Saury began playing violin the age of twelve. He switched to clarinet because he admired the playing of Hubert Rostaing. Shortly after World War II he began playing with Christian Azzi and Claude Bolling and briefly led a trio in 1949. In the 1950s he founded the New Orleans Sound, which included Jean-Claude Naude, and went on several tours worldwide. He played with Barney Bigard in the U.S. in the late 1960s and returned the U.S. twice in the 1970s. As a representative figure in French traditional jazz, he was frequently invited to play music, or the role of a musician, in film and television, including in Bonjour Tristesse, Les Tricheurs, Mon oncle, and Adieu Philippine.

References
André Clergeat, "Maxim Saury". The New Grove Dictionary of Jazz. 2nd edition, ed. Barry Kernfeld.

French jazz clarinetists
French jazz bandleaders
1928 births
2012 deaths
Black & Blue Records artists